According to the Gospel of Luke, the road to Emmaus appearance is one of the early post-resurrection appearances of Jesus after his crucifixion and the discovery of the empty tomb. Both the meeting on the road to Emmaus and the subsequent supper at Emmaus, depicting the meal that Jesus had with two disciples after the encounter on the road, have been popular subjects in art.

Biblical accounts

N. T. Wright considers the detailed narration of the Emmaus journey in Luke 24:13–35 as one of the best sketches of a biblical scene in the Gospel of Luke. Jan Lambrecht, citing D. P. Moessner, writes: "the Emmaus story is one of Luke's 'most exquisite literary achievements'." It describes the encounter on the road to Emmaus and the supper at Emmaus, and states that a disciple named Cleopas was walking towards Emmaus with another disciple when they met Jesus. They did not recognize him, and discussed their sadness at recent events with him. They persuaded him to come and eat with them, and at the meal they recognized him.

Theme
Although it may be said that its main subject is proving the resurrection by the appearance of Jesus, this narrative seems not to say anything about proving the event. R. W. L. Moberly suggests that "the story is best understood as an exposition of the hermeneutical issue of discernment, focusing specifically on the question, 'How does one discern the risen Christ? Alfred McBride says that the Emmaus narrative concerns "the evolution of the awareness of the two disciples, from despair over Christ's death to faith in his resurrection". Used to perceive Christian spiritual growth, this narrative is considered as a model for a Christians' own journey to a deeper faith and as an instrument to help others do the same journey.

Parallels
The Gospel of Mark has a similar account that describes the appearance of Jesus to two disciples while they were walking in the country, at about the same time in the Gospel narrative, although it does not name the disciples or the destination as Emmaus:

It has also been suggested that the Ethiopian eunuch story (Acts 8:26–40) is a "much discussed parallel" to the Emmaus narrative, since there are some recognizable similarities between the two. Lambrecht says, "Each event culminates with a ritual, the breaking and distributing of bread at Emmaus and the baptism of the Ethiopian along the road. [...] What remains as a common theme in both stories is the necessary hermeneutical connection between the Scriptures and the Jesus event. The Scriptures are to be interpreted in the light of 'the good news of Jesus' (Acts 8) and the Jesus events can only be understood in light of the Scriptures (Lk 24)."

Unnamed disciple

Many names have been proposed for the disciple who accompanied Cleopas. Among those who have been suggested: Simon/Symeon, according to several documents and manuscripts; Ammaon/Amaon, which may be a spelling error for "Symeon", according to Saint Ambrose; Nathanael, according to Saint Epiphanius's Panarion; Nicodemus, according to the Arabic Apocryphal Gospel of John; Luke the Evangelist, according to the Book of the Bee; Philip the Deacon; James, brother of Jesus; and Mary, the wife (or possibly daughter) of Clopas, who is considered the same person as Cleopas.

The journey to Emmaus
The two followers were walking along the road, heading to Emmaus, deep in solemn and serious discussion, when Jesus met them. They could not recognize Jesus and saw him as a stranger. In Homilies on the Gospels ( 23), Gregory the Great says:

Jesus let them tell about their anxieties and pains; he let them grieve and mourn by expressing the root causes. Jesus emphatically listened to them, who poured out their crises and doubts, and used scriptures so that they could better understand "suffering and glory". During the journey to Emmaus, according to Alfred McBride, Jesus patiently guided the two disciples "from hopelessness to celebration" and also intended to nourish the two disciples' faith to such an extent that they can see "his real presence in the breaking of the bread".

From a pastoral perspective, John Mossi writes that meditating upon the "Emmaus Pilgrimage" may help one when experiencing one's own "dark nights". During such course of action, according to Mossi, one should realize that Jesus compassionately walks as a friend on one's own journey, empathetically listens one's sorrows and hesitations, and spends quality time accompanying one goes through the process of inner healing.

"Stay with us"
Luke 24:28–29 states that Jesus stayed and had supper with the two disciples after the encounter on the road:

The two disciples showed their openness and caring to the unknown stranger, who is Jesus, by inviting him to stay with them, to join in meal and companionship. Lambrecht argues that such attitudes made Jesus able to change them deeply: "By the offer of hospitality the Emmaus companions were able to transcend their self-concern, sadness, foolishness and slowness of heart, thus preparing them for the revelatory experience around the table where they were nourished."

Supper at Emmaus
At first, Jesus appears to Cleopas and one other disciple, but "their eyes were holden" so that they could not recognize him. Later, "in the breaking of bread" (Luke 24:30), "their eyes were opened" and they recognized him (Luke 24:31). B. P. Robinson argues that this means that the recognition occurred in the course of the meal, while Raymond Blacketer notes that "many, perhaps even most, commentators, ancient and modern and in-between, have seen the revelation of Jesus' identity in the breaking of bread as having some kind of eucharistic referent or implication."

In his apostolic letter , John Paul II says that when the two disciples urged Jesus to stay  them, Jesus afterwards responded by giving them a way to stay  him, by entering into "a profound communion with Jesus" through the "Sacrament of the Eucharist" (cf. John 15:4). Soon after Jesus agreed to their request to stay, according to the Pope, "Jesus' face would disappear, yet the Master would 'stay' with them, hidden in the 'breaking of the bread' which had opened their eyes to recognize him. [...] When minds are enlightened and hearts are enkindled, signs begin to 'speak'."

Return to Jerusalem
Luke 24:32 states that the two disciples' hearts were "burning" during their conversation with Jesus along the way to Emmaus, especially when he explained the Scriptures. They have gone through "a journey symbolizing their change of hearts from 'sad' to 'burning, and they immediately returned to Jerusalem to share their experience with other fellows (Luke 24:33).

Alfred McBride says that "enthusiasm flooded their whole being" when the two disciples have "encounter[ed] the Risen Christ" in the supper at Emmaus. They sensed a must to share their happiness and the good news with another so that they were willing to go through a long walk back to Jerusalem. John Paul II argues that the two disciples realized "the duty to be a missionary" after "entering into communion with Christ" at the meal event, relates it with the dismissal at the end of the Eucharistic Celebration.

In art

Both the encounter on the road and the ensuing supper have been depicted in art, but the supper has received more attention.  Medieval art tends to show a moment before Jesus is recognized; Christ wears a large floppy hat to help explain the initial lack of recognition by the disciples. This is often a large pilgrim's hat with badges or, rarely, a Jewish hat.  However, the depiction of the supper has been a more popular theme, at least since the Renaissance, showing Jesus eating with the disciples. Often the moment of recognition is shown.

Rembrandt's 1648 depiction of the supper builds on the etching that he did six years earlier, in which the disciple on the left had risen, hands clasped in prayer. In both depictions, the disciples are startled and in awe but not in fear. The servant is oblivious to the theophanic moment taking place during the supper.

Caravaggio's painting in London and his painting in Milan were six years apart, and both imitate natural color very well, but both were criticized for lack of decorum. Caravaggio depicted Jesus without a beard, and the London painting shows fruits on the table that are out of season. Moreover, the inn keeper is shown serving with a hat.

Some other artists who have portrayed the supper are Jacopo Bassano, Pontormo, Vittore Carpaccio, Philippe de Champaigne, Albrecht Dürer, Benedetto Gennari, Jacob Jordaens, Marco Marziale, Pedro Orrente, Tintoretto, Titian, Velázquez, and Paolo Veronese. The supper was also the subject of one of Han van Meegeren's most successful Vermeer forgeries.

In literary art, the Emmaus theme is treated as early as the 12th century by Durham poet Laurentius in a semidramatic Latin poem.

Gallery of art

In music 
The gospel was the prescribed reading for Easter Monday in Lutheran Leipzig at Bach's time. He composed several church cantatas for the occasion, including the chorale cantata Bleib bei uns, denn es will Abend werden, BWV 6, in 1725.

Josef Rheinberger composed in 1855 a motet Abendlied on a verse from the gospel narration, "Bleib bei uns" (Bide with us).

The American southern gospel music group The Emmaus Road Quartet takes their name from the Biblical account. They also recorded a song entitled "On The Road to Emmaus" in 2019, in which the lyrics espouse a desire to walk with a risen Jesus Christ and be taught the scriptures by him.

Jungian perspective
Carl Jung regarded the road to Emmaus appearance as a mythological example of the common dream theme of the magical traveling companion.

Contemporary use
Emmaus, Pennsylvania, a township in the Lehigh Valley region of the United States, draws its name from the Biblical references to Emmaus.

See also

 Chronology of Jesus
 Emmaus-Nicopolis
 Gospel harmony
 Life of Jesus in the New Testament
 List of dining events
 Resurrection appearance of Jesus 
 Resurrection of Jesus

Notes

References
 

 
 

 

Christian iconography
Dining events
Gospel of Luke
Jesus in art
 
Post-resurrection appearances of Jesus